Grete Knudsen (born 13 October 1940) is a Norwegian politician for the Labour Party. She was the state secretary to the Minister of Education and Church Affairs 1979–1981, Minister of Social Affairs (social affairs) 1992–1994, Minister of Foreign Affairs (trade and shipping affairs) 1994–1996, Minister of Industry and Energy (industry affairs) 1996, Minister of Industry and Trade 1997, as well as minister of Nordic cooperation 1996–1997, and Minister of Industry and Trade 2000–2001 in the first cabinet Stoltenberg. Knudsen was a teacher before her political career, and worked as principal of a special education school in Bergen.

In 2008 she was appointed as a member of the board of the National Gallery of Norway.

On 13 August 2013 she released a book, Basketak (Brawl) that Stein Kåre Kristiansen (a political commentator for TV2) called "This is an unpleasant package of shit in the middle of the election campaign. This does not suit the Labour Party well." On the same day Jan-Erik Larsen said that he had spoken to party leaders at the lowest level, from all over Norway, and the verdict is clear: This is what the party needed the least, at the moment.

References

1940 births
Living people
Ministers of Trade and Shipping of Norway
Members of the Storting
Labour Party (Norway) politicians
21st-century Norwegian politicians
20th-century Norwegian politicians